Larry G. Smith (November 11, 1914 – March 22, 1992) was a member of the Ohio House of Representatives.

References

Democratic Party members of the Ohio House of Representatives
1914 births
1992 deaths
20th-century American politicians